The 1972 Washington Star International was a men's tennis tournament that was played on outdoor clay courts at the Washington Tennis Stadium in Washington, D.C. The event was part of the 1972 World Championship Tennis circuit. It was the fourth edition of the tournament and was held  from July 17 through July 23, 1972. Tony Roche won the singles title after surviving a match point in the final against Marty Riessen.

Finals

Singles
 Tony Roche defeated  Marty Riessen 3–6, 7–6, 6–4

Doubles
 Tom Okker /  Marty Riessen defeated  John Newcombe /  Tony Roche 3–6, 6–3, 6–2

References

External links
 ATP tournament profile
 ITF tournament details

Washington Open (tennis)
Washington Star International
Washington Star International
Washington Star International